The 2019–20 Segunda División Pro, named Reto Iberdrola for sponsorship reasons, was the inaugural season edition of the new Spanish women's football second-tier league.

The league started on 7 September 2019 and will end on 17 May 2020.

On 6 May 2020, the Royal Spanish Football Federation announced the premature end of the league, revoking relegations and naming Eibar and Santa Teresa as promoted teams.

Teams and locations

32 teams took part, 30 moving up from the 2018–19 Segunda División and 2 relegated from the 2018–19 Primera División.

Atlántida Matamá resigned to its place in the league. Sporting Gijón occupied its place as the next qualified team in their group from the previous season.

Standings and results

Group North

Standings

Results

Top goalscorers

Source: BDFutbol

Group South

Standings

Results

Top goalscorers

Source: BDFutbol

References

External links
Primera División (women) at La Liga 
RFEF Official Website 

Spa
2
women's 2
Segunda Federación (women) seasons
Spain